The Cultural Industries Quarter is a district in the city centre of Sheffield, England, and one of the eleven Quarters designated in the 1994 City Centre Strategy. It is roughly triangular in shape, and is bound by Howard Street, Sheaf Square and Suffolk Road to the north-east, St Mary's Road to the south and Eyre Street and Arundel Gate to the north-west, with Granville Square in the south-east.  The name given reflects the intention to create a cluster of music, film and science-based businesses in the area.

Organisations based in the area include:
Showroom/Workstation
Red Tape Music Studios
Leadmill nightclub and venue
Sheffield Hallam University and its Students' Union (former National Centre for Popular Music)
Sheffield Institute of Art Gallery
Sheffield Live
Site Gallery - art gallery
Spearmint Rhino
CBC Computer Systems Ltd

The Sheffield Doc/Fest is held around the CIQ each June.

Significant buildings

The Butcher's Wheel
Stirling Works
92 & 92a Arundel Street
113 Arundel Street
Sylvester Works
Venture Works
Truro Works
Columbia Place
Redwood House
Cooper Buildings

References

External links
Cultural Industries Quarter Agency
Official Site

Sheffield City Centre (quarters)
Culture in Sheffield